Givira salome is a moth in the family Cossidae. It is found from Mexico through Costa Rica.

Givira
Moths described in 1910